The estimated population of unincorporated areas in Los Angeles County, California, is 1,095,592, out of a total of 10,160,000 of the entire county.

Unincorporated areas 
This table includes Census-designated places and other statistical areas.

Unincorporated communities 
 Agoura
 Alla
 Alpine
 Alsace
 Altacanyada
 Andrade Corner
 Antelope Acres
 Antelope Center
 Athens
 Bassett
 Big Pines
 Boiling Point
 Bonner (unincorporated Eastern Long Beach)
 Castaic Junction
 Cornell
 Del Sur
 Del Valle
 Firestone Park
 Gorman
 Hillgrove
 Hi Vista
 Indian Springs
 Juniper Hills
 Kagel Canyon
 Kinneloa Mesa
 Largo Vista
 Llano
 Malibu Vista
 Monte Nido
 Neenach
 Ninetynine Oaks
 Pearblossom
 Pioneer (Unincorporated Cerritos & Lakewood)
 Rancho Dominguez
 Red Box
 Sand Canyon
 Sandberg 
 Seminole Hot Springs
 Three Points
 Two Harbors  
 Valyermo
 Westfield (unincorporated Rolling Hills)

Ghost towns 
 Achois 
 Alpine 
 Alyeupkigna 
 Awigna 
 Azucsagna 
 Bairdstown 
 Bartolo 
 Cahuenga
 Chokishgna 
 Chowigna
 Cow Springs
 Eldoradoville
 Falling Springs 
 Fort Tejon
 Gaspur 
 Guirardo 
 Hahamongna 
 Harasgna 
 Holland Summit
 Hollands 
 Holton 
 Honmoyausha 
 Houtgna 
 Hyperion 
 Isanthcogna 
 Juyubit 
 King's Station
 Kowanga 
 Las Tunas
 Lyons Station
 Machado 
 Malibu Mar Vista 
 Maugna 
 Mentryville 
 Motordrome 
 Mud Spring
 Nacaugna 
 Oberg 
 Okowvinjha 
 Palisades del Rey 
 Pasinogna 
 Petroleopolis
 Pimocagna 
 Pubugna 
 Quapa 
 Savannah 
 Saway-yanga 
 Sibagna 
 Sisitcanogna 
 Soledad Sulphur Springs 
 Sonagna 
 Suangna 
 Takuyumam 
 Toviseanga 
 Toybipet 
 Tuyunga 
 Virgenes 
 Wahoo 
 Walton Place 
 Widow Smith's Station
 Wilsona

References 

Lists of populated places in California
Los Angeles County, California